A saddleback roof is usually on a tower, with a ridge and two sloping sides, producing a gable at each end.

See also 
 List of roof shapes
 Saddle roof

References

Architectural elements
Roofs